Aaram Arivu is a Tamil-language soap opera that aired on MediaCorp Vasantham from 27 June 2016 to 28 August 2016 at 10:30PM SST for 32 episodes. The show starred Shafinah Banu, Karthik Moorthy, Janani Devi, Dhurrgah Mathivanan and among others.

Cast
 Rajesh kannan
 Shafinah Banu
 Karthik Moorthy
 Janani Devi
 Dhurrgah Mathivanan
 Poobalan Arasu
 Dr. Kader Ibrahim

Broadcast
Series was released on 27 June 2016 on Mediacorp Vasantham. It aired in Malaysia on Mediacorp Vasantham, Its full length episodes and released its episodes on their app Toggle, a live TV feature was introduced on Toggle with English Subtitle.

References

External links 
 Vasantham Official Website
 Vasantham Facebook
 Aaram Arivu Serial Episode

Vasantham TV original programming
Singapore Tamil dramas
Tamil-language thriller television series
Tamil-language romance television series
2016 Tamil-language television series debuts
2010s Tamil-language television series
Tamil-language television shows in Singapore
2016 Tamil-language television series endings